Maze Grill Royal Hospital Road (stylised as maze Grill Royal Hospital Road and formerly Foxtrot Oscar) is a restaurant in Chelsea, London, England owned by celebrity chef and restaurateur Gordon Ramsay.

History
Foxtrot Oscar was founded in 1980 by Michael Proudlock. After running into financial difficulties, he sold the business to Gordon Ramsay but subsequently reacquired it in 2007. After refurbishment, the restaurant was reopened on 21 January 2008 by Gordon Ramsay Holdings (GRH). In May 2015, Foxtrot Oscar became Ramsay's third Maze Grill outlet, and was renamed as Maze Grill Royal Hospital Road.

Reception
Melanie Kruger, a reviewer for Luxury Lifestyle Magazine, praised the service and atmosphere of the restaurant, writing that Maze Grill Royal Hospital Road "has got simple food done right down to a fine art, and every dish is an explosion of tastes and textures that will leave you hungry for more."

See also
 List of restaurants owned or operated by Gordon Ramsay

References

Restaurants in England